Legislative elections were held in Romania on 11 December 2016. They were the first held under a new electoral system adopted in 2015, which saw a return to the proportional electoral system last used in the 2004 elections. The new electoral legislation provides a norm of representation for deputies of 73,000 inhabitants and 168,000 inhabitants for senators, which decreased the number of MPs.

A total of 466 parliamentary seats (308 deputies, 18 minority deputies, and 134 senators) were contested, compared with the 588 parliamentarians elected in 2012. The diaspora was represented by four deputies and two senators, elected by postal vote. The elections saw a turnout of 39.5%, lower than in 2012 but slightly higher than in the 2008 elections.

New electoral system
The legislative election of 2016 unfolded differently compared to 2012 and 2008. On 24 February 2015, the Electoral Code Commission decided in principle for the future electoral law to return to party-list proportional representation, thereby relinquishing the first-past-the-post (uninominal) voting system as introduced in 2008. The option of turning the Parliament of Romania into a perfectly bicameral parliament, with some 300 deputies being elected on a closed list and 100 senators being elected by a single-round uninominal majority vote, had been discussed for years and even agreed upon between the ruling Social Democratic Party (PSD) and the opposition. The new electoral law promulgated by President Klaus Iohannis on 20 July 2015 however did not retain uninominal constituencies for the Senate. Closely sticking to the commission's recommendations, the new electoral law completely returned to party-list proportional representation.

With a representation norm of one deputy per 73,000 inhabitants and one senator per 168,000 inhabitants, a total of 308 deputies were elected, to which are added the 18 deputies of minorities, 134 senators and 6 MPs of diaspora (two senators and four deputies). All in all this totals to a number of 466 MPs, five fewer than in 2008 and 122 fewer than in 2012. While for single-party lists the electoral threshold is kept at 5%, a higher threshold of 8–10% is introduced for electoral alliances. For the first time the Romanian electors residing abroad were able to cast their vote via mail, in a reaction to the flawed procedures at the 2014 presidential election.

Parties

Although the image of Victor Ponta and his Social Democratic Party (PSD) was badly affected by corruption scandals and a recent wave of protests, the party remains one of the two major parties in Romania. Besides the PSD, the Romanian party system however went through a number of substantial regroupings.

Major regroupings
Leading centre-left Social Democratic Party (PSD) and the Centre Right Alliance (ACD) of the Conservative Party (PC) and National Liberal Party (PNL) contested the 2012 legislative election under the joint ticket of the Social Liberal Union (USL). They won an absolute majority to form a government headed by prime minister Victor Ponta.

Over time, the PC and PNL increasingly distanced themselves from each other, with the PC – despite its name – embracing social liberalism and being affected by corruption scandals involving its leader, Dan Voiculescu, who was subsequently sentenced to prison for money laundering. In turn, the PNL dropped out of the coalition government in February 2014. Formerly affiliated with the Alliance of Liberals and Democrats for Europe (ALDE), the party applied for membership in the European People's Party (EPP) and was later accepted as a member. The PNL's shift to the right led to a faction led by Călin Popescu-Tăriceanu leaving to form the Liberal Reformist Party (PLR), which then merged with the PC to found the Romanian Alliance of Liberals and Democrats (ALDE), named after the European party. This move was criticized by Conservative MEP Maria Grapini, who accused her party of betrayal.

Subsequently, the PNL joined forces with the Democratic Liberal Party (PDL), which itself had suffered a split when Traian Băsescu left to form the People's Movement (PMP). Ahead of a complete merger, the PDL and PNL formed the Christian Liberal Alliance (ACL), which successfully fielded Klaus Iohannis in the November 2014 presidential election. The two parties fully merged on 17 November 2014 under the name of National Liberal Party (PNL).

In June 2015, the left-wing National Union for the Progress of Romania (UNPR) which was previously in the Centre Left Alliance (ACS) with the Social Democrats (PSD), absorbed the remainders of dissolved populist PP-DD after the latter's founder Dan Diaconescu was convicted for extortion. UNPR president Gabriel Oprea advanced an independent list for his party for the 2016 legislative election. Though it aimed to win 10% of national vote on its own, the party also reaffirmed its commitment to the Centre Left Alliance (ACS) with the PSD. However, in July 2016, UNPR joined the right-leaning People's Movement Party (PMP) led by former president Traian Băsescu, despite protests from some UNPR members. Oprea, himself under investigation for abuse of power, resigned from the party and declared his intention to leave politics.

Further developments

A new nationalist party, United Romania Party (PRU), was founded by MP Bogdan Diaconu on 17 August 2014 and became official by court decision on 17 February 2015.

Also notable was the rise of the Union for the Salvation of Romania (USR), a party recently created from its base in Bucharest as the Union for the Salvation of Bucharest. Led by Nicușor Dan, a mathematics professor, it was a reformist group of newcomers to politics committed to rooting out corruption. Polling suggested that the USR would exceed its goal of winning 10% of the popular vote.

The Democratic Alliance of Hungarians in Romania (UDMR/RMDSZ), the largest party representing an ethnic minority, was also projected to be represented in the parliament.

Opinion polls

Graphical summary of the polls

Results

Chamber of Deputies

Senate

See also 
List of members of the Senate of Romania (2016–2020)
List of members of the Chamber of Deputies of Romania (2016–2020)

Notes

References

External links

Romania
Legislative
Romania
Parliamentary elections in Romania